The 2011 season of the Torneio Nacional Interprovincial is the first edition of the third tier of the Bolivian Football pyramid. The inaugural season is played with 8 provincial champions (Cochabamba FA was suspended). The host city of this edition is Santa Cruz. The winners was promoted to the 2011-12 Liga Nacional B.

Teams

Semifinals

Final

Torneo Nacional Interprovincial seasons
3